Tom Caron (born November 18, 1963) is a sportscaster and anchor on New England's NESN network.

Background
Caron is a graduate of Lewiston High School in Maine and Saint Michael's College in Vermont, where he majored in journalism.

After graduating, Caron took a job with a small newspaper in Vermont covering the Vermont Reds, Cincinnati's AA affiliate.  He quickly left that job to take a job with WPTZ-TV in Plattsburgh, New York, where he covered the Montreal Canadiens and Montreal Expos.  He later held a sports anchor job at WNNE-TV in Hanover, New Hampshire.

In 1988, he took a sports anchor job at WGME-TV in Portland, Maine, where he stayed for five years. In addition to his anchor duties, he hosted a weekly ski segment and produced a number of half-hour sports specials.

In 1993, he left WGME-TV to work as a sports reporter at WPXT-TV in Portland, where he also hosted a weekly hockey feature.  Caron also provided play-by-play coverage for the Portland Pirates as well as the New England Stingers of Roller Hockey International.

NESN
Caron joined NESN in 1995, and has been with the network ever since.  His first job for the network was hosting the sports magazine Front Row. He later served as the station's Boston Bruins studio host and Red Sox field reporter, and also did play-by-play coverage for the Providence Bruins and Pawtucket Red Sox, as well as college basketball and college hockey (including the Beanpot).

Caron currently hosts the New England Sports Network's (NESN) Red Sox coverage, including the Red Sox pre- and postgame shows.  During the baseball off-season, he serves as host of The Instigators, a weekly roundtable discussion of issues surrounding the NHL, and is the play-by-play announcer for the network's Hockey East broadcasts as well as The Beanpot.

Caron writes a weekly sports column for the Tuesday edition of the Portland Press Herald, mostly pertaining to the Red Sox, Bruins, and New England Patriots.

He also makes frequent guest appearances on sports talk radio station WEEI-FM to discuss the Boston Red Sox, and makes weekly appearances on 102.9 WBLM-FM ("The Blimp") and 101.3 WCPV-FM ("The Game") in Burlington, Vermont.

While reporting during a March 2023 spring training game for the  Boston Red Sox, on NESN, a cat ran onto the field and into the home team dugout, where it jumped at him.

Personal life
Caron lives in Framingham, Massachusetts with his wife Kelley and their two sons Jack and Robbie.

He is often called "TC" by his NESN co-workers.

Awards
Caron has won three New England Emmy Awards, a New York State Broadcasters Award, two James Ellery Awards (given for excellence in covering the American Hockey League), and the ECAC Media Award. On March 29, 2014, Caron was inducted into the Portland Pirates Hall of Fame along with former Bruins goaltender Byron Dafoe, former Washington Capitals goaltender Olaf Kolzig, and Nashville Predators coach Barry Trotz. On October 2, 2018, Tom was the 27th recipient of the Hockey East Joe Concannon Media Award, given annually to the media member who demonstrates continued excellence in promoting and advancing the Hockey East conference in the media.

References

External links 
NESN Homepage

College basketball announcers in the United States
National Hockey League broadcasters
Major League Baseball broadcasters
Boston sportscasters
Living people
American television reporters and correspondents
People from Lewiston, Maine
Television anchors from Boston
Boston Bruins announcers
Boston Red Sox announcers
College hockey announcers in the United States
American Hockey League broadcasters
Saint Michael's College alumni
Lewiston High School (Maine) alumni
1963 births